Ollancy Arrebato Gainza (born 15 February 1994) is a Cuban footballer who plays as a midfielder. She has been a member of the Cuba women's national team.

International career
Arrebato capped for Cuba at senior level during the 2018 CONCACAF Women's Championship qualification.

References

1994 births
Living people
Cuban women's footballers
Cuba women's international footballers
Women's association football midfielders
21st-century Cuban women